The 1943 All-Ireland Senior Football Championship Final was the 56th All-Ireland Final and the deciding match of the 1943 All-Ireland Senior Football Championship, an inter-county Gaelic football tournament for the top teams in Ireland.

Roscommon defeated Cavan after a replay to win their first title.

Cavan finished the replay with fourteen men after Joe Stafford was dismissed with fifteen minutes remaining.

References

All-Ireland Senior Football Championship Final
All-Ireland Senior Football Championship Final, 1943
All-Ireland Senior Football Championship Finals
Cavan county football team matches
Roscommon county football team matches